Ellen Byron (born January 12, 1956, in Los Angeles) is an American novelist, screenwriter, and producer. 

As a novelist, she has written the Cajun Country Mystery series and Vintage Cookbook Mystery series, as well as the Catering Hall Mystery series under the pseudonym Maria DiRico. She has won the Agatha Award for Best Contemporary Novel twice and the Lefty Award for Best Humorous Mystery Novel. 

As a screenwriter, she has written for Wings, Just Shoot Me!, and The Fairly OddParents.

Biography 
Byron was born January 12, 1956, in Los Angeles.

She attended Tulane University. Her experiences in Louisiana inspired her Cajun Country Mystery series.

Byron has written over 200 articles for newspapers and journals, including The Wall Street Journal.

Awards and honors

Publications

Cajun Country Mystery series 

 Plantation Shudders (2015)
 Body on the Bayou (2016)
 A Cajun Christmas Killing (2017)
 Mardi Gras Murder (2018)
 Fatal Cajun Festival (2019)
 Murder in the Bayou Boneyard (2020)
 Cajun Kiss of Death (2021)

Catering Hall Mystery series (as Maria DiRico) 

 Here Comes the Body (2020)
 Long Island Iced Tina (2021)
 It's Beginning to Look a Lot Like Murder (2021)
 Four Parties and a Funeral (2023)

Plays 

 Graceland and Asleep on the Wind (1998)
 Election Year and So When You Get Married.... Two Short Plays. (1998)

Vintage Cookbook Mystery series 

 Bayou Book Thief (2022)
 Wined and Died in New Orleans (2023)

Television

References

External links 

 Official website

1956 births
21st-century American women writers
Writers from Los Angeles
Living people